Tara Sabharwal (born 1957, New Delhi) is an Indian-born, US-based painter and printmaker. Known for her colorful, subtly layered paintings, Sabharwal has had 42 solo shows in the UK, US, India, among others. She has received several awards, including the Joan Mitchell CALL (Creating a Living Legacy), The British Council Scholarship, and the Gottlieb Foundation awards. Her work is in the collection of The British Museum, Victoria and Albert Museum, and the Peabody Essex Museum among others.

Education and career
Sabharwal studied painting at M.S University (Baroda, India) 1975–1980, and received her master's degree at the Royal College of Art (London, UK) in 1982–1984. She returned to India from 1985 to 1988 and had shows in Delhi and Mumbai and London. From 1988 to 1990 she returned to UK for fellowships, teaching and solo shows. In 1990 Sabharwal visited New York and settled there, while continuing to work and show in the UK and India. She has taught at the Guggenheim museum, Rubin museum, CUNY, Studio in a school, and The Cooper Union in New York City.

Selected exhibitions 

 An Ocean of Galaxies, Aidron Duckworth Museum, New Hampshire, (2019)
 Float, Wilmer Jennings gallery, New York (2018) 
 The Open Window, Art Alive Gallery, New Delhi (2017)
 A PARTners, Gertrude Herbert Institute of Art, Georgia US  (2017)
 In Other Rooms, Art Alive Gallery, New Delhi (2013)
 Such Different Paths, Galerie Martina Janzen, Düsseldorf (2010)
 Light and the Labrynth, Center for International Cultural exchange, Katsuyama, Japan (2008)
 Life Journeys, V.M. gallery, Karachi, (2007)
 The Dream of Waking Consciousness, Art Heritage Gallery New Delhi (2005)
 Wandering, Michael Oess Galerie, Konstanz, Germany (2003)
 Gentle Shade, Rebecca Hossack Gallery, (London) (1994)
 Visions, Laing Art Gallery, (Newcastle UK) (1990)
 Recent Works,  Art Heritage Gallery New Delhi

Selected awards 

 1982    British Council Scholarship and travel grants (London, UK).
 1988    Myles Meehan fellowship (Darlington, UK)
 1989    Durham Cathedral fellowship (Durham, UK).
 2015    CALL, (Creating a Living legacy award) Joan Mitchell foundation, (NYC, USA)
 2016    Individual support grant, Gottlieb Foundation (NYC, US).
 2017    Artist in Residence, Atelierhaus Beisinghoff (Kassel, Germany)
 2018    Belt and Road Project, Guanlan printmaking base, (Shinzhen, China)
 2019    Visiting Artist Vermont Studio Center, (Virginia, USA)
 2019    Residency, MassMoca,  (MA, USA)

Selected collections 

 MONA, Museum of Nebraska Art (NE, USA)
 The British Museum (London, UK)
 The New York Public library (NYC, USA)
 Victoria and Albert Museum (UK, USA)
 Peabody Essex Museum (MA, USA)
 Library of Congress (D.C, USA)

Videos 

 Another Kind of Space, Women's Studio Workshop, 2018 
 VoCa Talk, Voices of Contemporary Art, NYC, Nov 2017 at Fales Library, NYU.
 From Hishio: Tara Sabharwal, Artist Residency at Center for International Cultural Exchange, HISHIO, Japan, video by Tom Dean, 2008

References

1957 births
Indian women painters
Women artists from Delhi
Living people
Painters from Delhi
21st-century Indian painters
21st-century Indian women artists
Indian expatriates in the United States